Magic Power may refer to:

"Magic Power" (Triumph song), 1981
"Magic Power" (Hey! Say! JUMP song), 2011

See also
Magic (disambiguation)